Tarne is a monotypic genus of West African jumping spiders containing the single species, Tarne dives. It was first described by Eugène Louis Simon in 1886, and is found only in Africa.

References

Invertebrates of West Africa
Monotypic Salticidae genera
Salticidae
Spiders of Africa